Pablo Guzmán may refer to:

 Pablo Guzmán (footballer) (born 1970), better known as Pablo Gómez, Spanish retired footballer
 Pablo Guzmán (reporter), American reporter
 Pablo Guzmán (volleyball, born 1988), Argentine volleyball player
 Pablo Guzmán Parés, Puerto Rican volleyball player, previously of Asswehly SC
 Pablo Guzmán (Venezuelan caudillo), participant in the Liberating Revolution 1901–1903